Radhakishan Shivkishan Damani is an Indian billionaire investor, business magnate and the founder of Avenue Supermarts Limited. He also manages his portfolio through his Investment firm, Bright Star Investments Limited. On 19 August 2021, he was ranked #98 richest person in the world by Bloomberg Billionaire Index.

Career
Radhakishan Shivkishan Damani was raised in a Maheshwari Marwari family in single room apartment in Mumbai. He studied commerce at the University of Mumbai but dropped out after one year. After the death of his father who worked on Dalal Street, Damani left his ball bearing business and became a stock market broker and investor. He made profits by short-selling stocks in the 1990s. Damani was reportedly the largest individual shareholder of HDFC Bank after it went public in 1995.
In the year 1992, after the Harshad Mehta Scam came to limelight, he saw a major rise in his income due to the short-selling profits during the time.
In 1999, he operated a franchise of Apna Bazaar, a cooperative department store, in Nerul, but was "unconvinced" by its business model. He quit stock market in 2000 to start his own hypermarket chain, DMart, setting up the first store in Powai in 2002. The chain had 25 stores in 2010, post-which the company grew rapidly and went public in 2017.''' 

In 2020, he became the fourth-richest Indian with a net worth of $16.5 billion. He was ranked #117 on the global list of billionaires. He was ranked #87 on the global list (Forbes) of billionaires 2022  with a net worth of $18.9 billion.

Investments 
Damani also holds stakes in a range of companies, from tobacco firm VST industries to cement producer India Cements. Damani picked up a 1% stake in Andhra Paper. Damani also picked up 15% stake in India cements in May 2020 taking his investment in India Cements to 19.89%. Damani publicly holds 6 stocks in his investment portfolio and total value of his stock portfolio is approx  in 2021.

Personal life 
He is married and has three children.

References

Indian businesspeople
Businesspeople from Mumbai
Marwari people
1954 births
Living people
Indian investors
University of Mumbai alumni